Revelstoke Secondary is the only public high school in Revelstoke, British Columbia part of School District 19 Revelstoke. In October 2011, a transition was made from the old school into a new 40 million dollar project, built directly beside the old building. The new school building is one of the most modern and environmentally friendly schools in Canada and includes a 275-seat theatre, an oversized gymnasium, a fitness room, a fully equipped library, two computer labs, woodwork and automotive shops, an art room, a drama facility, food services, a music/band room, science labs, a home economics area, and general student services spaces.

Revelstoke Secondary School (RSS) is known for its strong track and field team and athletic program which is complemented by a vibrant music and visual arts program.  The students at RSS have above-average academic results as measured by the BC Ministry of Education, and most recently was tied for first among all the secondary schools in British Columbia.

References

http://revelstokesecondary.sd19.bc.ca/about-our-school/

High schools in British Columbia
Revelstoke, British Columbia
Educational institutions established in 1952
1952 establishments in British Columbia